Pieris ( or ) is a genus of seven species of shrubs in the flowering plant family Ericaceae, native to mountain regions of eastern and southern Asia, eastern North America and Cuba. The young leaves in spring are typically brightly coloured. The fruit is a woody capsule which splits into five sections to release the numerous small seeds.

Pieris species are used as food plants by the larvae of some Lepidoptera species including the engrailed.

The genus name derives from Pieria, a place in Greece, according to Greek mythology the home of the Muses.

Species
Pieris cubensis (Grisebach) Small. Western Cuba.
Pieris floribunda (Pursh ex Simms) Benth. & Hook. – mountain andromeda, mountain pieris, mountain fetterbush. Eastern United States.
Pieris formosa (Wallich) D.Don – Chinese pieris, Himalayan pieris. The Himalaya, southwestern China (Yunnan), northern Myanmar.
Pieris japonica (Thunb.) D.Don ex G.Don – Japanese andromeda. Eastern China, Japan, Taiwan.
Pieris nana (Maxim.) Makino (syn. Arcterica nana). Japan, eastern Siberia.
Pieris phillyreifolia (Hook.) DC. – climbing fetterbush. Southeastern United States.
Pieris swinhoei Hemsley – southeastern China (Fujian, Guangdong).

Cultivation
They are commonly grown as ornamental plants, valued for year-round interest due to bright red new growth in early spring, chains of small, white flowers in mid-spring, and buds that remain on the plant through the winter. Numerous cultivars have been selected for different spring foliage colour. They grow best in a shady spot, sheltered from drying, winter winds. They prefer acid soil, and should be mulched once per year, using a two-inch covering of either peat or composted pine needles. The flowers give the plant one of its alternative names, 'Lily of the valley shrub' (though Pieris is not closely related to Convallaria).

Cultivars
The following cultivars have gained the Royal Horticultural Society's Award of Garden Merit:- 

 'Blush'
 'Cavatine'
 'Debutante'
 'Firecrest'
 'Flaming silver'
 'Forest flame'
 'Mountain fire'
 'Pink delight'
 'Prelude'
 'Purity'
 'Sarabande'
 'Valley Valentine'
 'Wakehurst'

Toxicity
Pieris floribunda (mountain fetterbush) has been noted as highly toxic.

References

External links

Germplasm Resources Information Network: Pieris
Flora of China: Pieris

New York Botanic Garden: Pieris cubensis
Pieris.eu – Information about Pieris japonica

 
Ericaceae genera
Garden plants